Sinonyx ("Chinese claw") is a genus of extinct, superficially wolf-like  mesonychid mammals from the late Paleocene of China (about 56 million years ago). It is within the family Mesonychidae, and cladistic analysis of a skull of Sinonyx jiashanensis identifies its closest relative as Ankalagon. S. jiashanensis was discovered in Anhui province, China (paleocoordinates ), in the Tuijinshan formation.

Description
Sinonyx was about 1.5 m (5 ft) long, about the size of a modern grey wolf with a large elongated head, short legs, digitigrade feet adapted for running, and tiny hooves on all of its toes. The tooth count was 3.1.4.3=44, the primitive mammalian number. The canines were long and slender. Compressed teeth with shearing notches in the lower jaw operated against multiple-cusped molars in the upper. The large skull had an extended occipital bone and large sagittal crest that contained the small brain typical of early mammals. The sagittal crest gave expanded attachment for the temporalis muscles; Sinonyx had a powerful bite.

Morphologic similarities between Sinonyx and cetaceans

Morphologists long thought that Sinonyx was the direct ancestor of Cetacea (whales and dolphins), but the discovery of well-preserved hind limbs of archaic cetaceans as well as more recent DNA phylogenetic analyses now indicates that cetaceans are more closely related to hippopotamids and other artiodactyls than they are to mesonychids, and this result is consistent with many molecular studies. Some studies have found Andrewsarchus, once considered a mesonychid, to form the sister group to the clade composed of Cetacea and Hippopotamidae along with Entelodontidae. Mesonychidae as defined by Szaly and Gould (1966) is probably paraphyletic or polyphyletic, with Hapalodectinae and Andrewsarchinae (represented by the lone skull of Andrewsarchus) wrongly assigned to the group. The subfamily Mesonychinae, which includes Sinonyx, appears to be monophyletic: mesonychids proper.

Sinonyx is no longer considered ancestral to Cetacea, but has convergent features to early land-dwelling whales that suggest it may have had some similar adaptations. Sinonyx''' elongated, narrow muzzle is often seen in animals that snap at small, fast-moving prey (such as mice among small canids, or small fish among dolphins). The triangular cheek teeth have a prominent middle cusp or point and two relatively equal sized cusps on each side; this unusual feature for mammal teeth is similar in archeocetes and led early researchers to believe mesonychids were ancestral to them. However, both groups began with generalized basal ungulate-type cheek teeth adapted for eating soft plant foods, and readapted them for a carnivorous diet; they are the only known mammal groups to have done this. Other characters Sinonyx'' has in common with early whales include an ossified tympanic bulla, which improves sensitivity to high-frequency sounds and is often seen in predators that hunt small prey by sound, and an enlarged jugular foramen, which gives more room for the cranial nerves that control swallowing and the balance between athletic activity and digestion.

See also
Killer whale
Pakicetus

Notes

References

 
 
 
 
 
 
 
 

Mesonychids
Prehistoric animals of China
Paleocene mammals
Paleocene genus extinctions
Fossil taxa described in 1995
Prehistoric placental genera